Etoile Haïtienne (English: Haitian Star) is a professional football club based in Port-au-Prince, Haiti. After the 2003 season, the club was relegated to Division 3.

The last known time the club played in Division 1 was in 1970.

History
Etoile Haïtienne appeared in its first championship in 1942 against longer established Racing Club Haïtien, another club in Port-au-Prince. Down 3–0 at halftime and less than ten minutes after Racing's last goal, Joe Gaetjens rebounded and scored to break the shutout. At the 53rd minute, Fritz Joseph scores. Seven minutes remaining, Frérot Rouzier scores the tying goal equalizing the match at 3–3. At the final minutes of regulation, a defiant Gaetjens kept on the attack, breaking the tie at 3–4, which ended up being the game-winner. To this day, Racing Club Haïtien refuses to play matches on the "Jeudi Saint" (Holy Thursday); the day of washing of the feet.

Honours
Ligue Haïtienne: 3
 1942, 1944, 1961

International competitions
CONCACAF Champions League: 1 appearance
1962 – First Round – Lost against  SITHOC, 3–8 on aggregate (3–2, 0–6)

References
Notes

Citations

Football clubs in Haiti
Ouest (department)